The Birmingham Back to Backs (also known as Court 15) are the city's last surviving court of back-to-back houses. They are preserved as examples of the thousands of similar houses that were built around shared courtyards, for the rapidly increasing population of Britain's expanding industrial towns. They are a very particular sort of British terraced housing. This sort of housing was deemed unsatisfactory, and the passage of the Public Health Act 1875 meant that no more were built; instead byelaw terraced houses took their place. This court, at 50–54 Inge Street and 55–63 Hurst Street, is now operated as a historic house museum by the National Trust.

Numerous back-to-back houses, two or three storeys high, were built in Birmingham during the 19th century. Most of these houses were concentrated in inner-city areas such as Ladywood, Handsworth, Aston, Small Heath and Highgate. Most were still in quite good condition in the early 20th century and also prior to their demolition. By the early 1970s, almost all of Birmingham's back-to-back houses had been demolished. The occupants were rehoused in new council houses and flats, some in redeveloped inner-city areas, while the majority moved to new housing estates such as Castle Vale and Chelmsley Wood.

History

Lease
By the end of the 18th century, the land where the houses are now located was owned by several families. The Inge family, after whom Inge Street is named, owned the land on the west side of the street whilst the Gooch family owned the land to the east side, where the back to backs were built. The plot of land was 50 yards long and 20 yards wide.

In 1789, Sir Thomas Gooch leased the land to John Willmore, a local toymaker. It was agreed that within a year, Willmore should construct two or more large houses at a total cost, including the outbuildings, of no less than £700. Willmore failed to do this and Court 15, as well as Court 14 adjacent, were built by his successors who remained on the street throughout the 19th century. When John Willmore died, the land was split between his sons Joseph and John Willmore, leading to the constructions looking different.

Construction
Court 14 was completed in 1802 by Joseph Willmore, a silversmith. It consisted of six front and eleven back houses with some workshops on the larger southern end of the building plot. When opened, it was known as Willmore's Court but was later renamed Court 14 Inge Street. It has since been demolished.

At this time, John Willmore, a carpenter and joiner, constructed a house and workshop for himself. By 1809, the undeveloped remainder of the plot consisted of two nailer's workshops and a cooper's workshop with a knacker's yard behind. The Hurst Street frontage was filled with sheds. By 1821, No. 50 Inge Street/ 1 Court 15 had been converted into a pair of back to backs. No. 52 Inge Street/ 2 Court 15 and No. 54 Inge Street/3 Court 15 were built about 1830. The terrace along Hurst Street was constructed in 1831.

Occupants

Throughout the 19th century, the court was occupied by workers who worked in such industries as button making, glasswork, woodwork, leatherwork, tailoring and were also skilled craftsmen in the jewellery and small metal trades. Many of such workers worked from home. Over 500 families have lived in Court 15.

From the 1830s to the 1930s, the Mitchells, a family of locksmiths and bellhangers, lived in the court. At one time, they were occupying both No. 55 Hurst Street and No. 54 Inge Street/3 Court 15. The family also worked at the workshop in the court for over 70 years.

In 1851, Joseph Barnett, a travelling jeweller, lived at number 35 Inge Street, with his wife Hanna, and four children, Samuel, Eli Louis, Rebecca and Henry.

Other people who lived there highlight the crowded conditions of the houses, which were usually occupied by single families. In 1851, for example Sophia Hudson, a widow who worked as a pearl button driller, probably from home, lived at No. 1 Court 15 with her five children and her mother who also a widow.  In 1861, Herbert Oldfield, a glass eye maker, occupied the same address with his wife and their eight children. At the same time, the Mitchell family had an apprentice who lived with them. Despite the cramped conditions, some families, such as the one who occupied 61 Hurst Street in 1851, were able to afford a servant.

By 1900, the ground floors had been converted into shops. Services offered from the buildings were a cycle maker, a hairdresser, a ticket writer, a fruiterer and a furniture dealer. The upper floors of No. 55 and No. 59 Hurst Street, the cycle maker's and the ticket writer's properties respectively, were converted into workshops as opposed to residential.

Most of the buildings remained in residential use until 1966 when they were declared as unfit for habitation. This resulted in those living in the buildings being required to leave.

Restoration
In 1988, the court received Grade II listed status from the Department of National Heritage. In 1995, Birmingham City Council commissioned the City of Hereford Archaeological Unit to survey and record them. Funding for this project was provided by the city council and English Heritage.

The Birmingham Back to Backs were restored by the Birmingham Conservation Trust, in collaboration with architects S. T. Walker & Duckham, and opened to the public on 21 July 2004. Their restoration was the subject of a five-part documentary by Carlton Television. Each of the four houses is decorated and furnished as if in a different era; 1840s, 1870s, 1930s and 1970s. Visits are by pre-booked, timed guided tours only.

Layout and design

The court consists of three pairs of back-to-back houses on Inge Street and a terrace of five blind back houses on Hurst Street, in the form of an L-shaped footprint. All the buildings are three storeys tall with one room on each floor.

No. 50 Inge Street/ 1 Court 15, the first to be constructed, is the tallest and the largest in the court. Some evidence exists to indicate that it was originally a single dwelling but it has been occupied for most of its life as a pair of back to backs. Evidence to show that it may have originally been one house is available through the layout of the attic. The attic runs across the whole depth of the pair of houses, but was never divided and can only be reached from the back house of No. 1 Court 15 where the surviving staircase is of much better quality than any remaining in the other houses in Court 15. On the second floor, there is a now-blocked doorway in the spine wall between the two houses indicating that the floors to both houses were both accessible. At this level too, No. 50 Inge Street has been split into two rooms by a partition wall. The smaller of the two rooms is unheated and lit by a casement window. There are two tall chimney stacks, one for each house, in the pair.

The tunnel entrance to the court runs between No. 52 Inge Street/ 2 Court 15 and No. 54 Inge Street/ 3 Court 15. Each pair of houses shares a single chimney set on the ridge of the roof. The two back houses each have a bay window to allow more light into the ground floor room. The lower floors to these houses have been divided by two spine walls. The upper floors are divided by one spine wall.

In No. 52 Inge Street/ 2 Court 15 only one original stairway remains — from the ground to the first floor in the front house. The stair in No. 54 Inge Street has been removed at ground floor level but in No. 3 Court 15 the complete staircase survives.

The rear entrances to Nos. 55, 57 and 59 are gained through a very narrow tunnel entry from Court 15. A staircase on the back wall of each house led up to the first and second floors. The houses were lit by windows on the Hurst Street side and heated by shared chimney stacks. No. 63 Hurst Street shared a chimney with No. 65 Hurst Street, the front house of a pair of back to backs which were part of Court 2 Hurst Street, now demolished. No. 55 Hurst Street has a large bay window at first floor level overlooking Inge Street, which is an early feature. All the houses in the terrace have late 20th century shop fronts, replacing earlier ones which were installed about 1900.

Court 15 may have originally had a water pump in the courtyard, though this is not known for certain. By the 1880s, a single tap had been installed. The brick paved yard contains an open drain running in front of the three back houses. In the 1930s, the two washhouses and water closets (outdoor flush toilets) were constructed on the site of the workshops and outbuildings in the courtyard.

References

Birmingham City Council: Back to back in Birmingham

Birmingham Back to Backs; Do something unforgettable..., The National Trust, 2006, HH Associates (leaflet)

External links

Birmingham Back to Backs information at the National Trust
BBC 360degree panorama of courtyard

Grade II listed buildings in Birmingham
Houses in Birmingham, West Midlands
Museums in Birmingham, West Midlands
National Trust properties in the West Midlands (county)
Historic house museums in the West Midlands (county)
1802 establishments in England